The qualifying phase and play-off round of the 2013–14 UEFA Champions League were played from 2 July to 28 August 2013, to decide 10 of the 32 places in the group stage.

All times were CEST (UTC+2).

Round and draw dates
All draws were held at UEFA headquarters in Nyon, Switzerland.

Format
In the qualifying phase and play-off round, each tie was played over two legs, with each team playing one leg at home. The team that scored more goals on aggregate over the two legs advanced to the next round. If the aggregate score was level, the away goals rule was applied, i.e., the team that scored more goals away from home over the two legs advanced. If away goals were also equal, then thirty minutes of extra time was played. The away goals rule was again applied after extra time, i.e., if there were goals scored during extra time and the aggregate score was still level, the visiting team advanced by virtue of more away goals scored. If no goals were scored during extra time, the tie was decided by penalty shoot-out.

In the draws for each round, teams were seeded based on their UEFA club coefficients at the beginning of the season, with the teams divided into seeded and unseeded pots. A seeded team was drawn against an unseeded team, with the order of legs in each tie decided randomly. Due to the limited time between matches, the draws for the second and third qualifying rounds took place before the results of the previous round were known. For these draws (or in any cases where the result of a tie in the previous round was not known at the time of the draw), the seeding was carried out under the assumption that the team with the higher coefficient of an undecided tie advanced to this round, which means if the team with the lower coefficient was to advance, it simply took the seeding of its defeated opponent. Prior to the draws, UEFA may form "groups" in accordance with the principles set by the Club Competitions Committee, but they were purely for convenience of the draw and for ensuring that teams from the same association were not drawn against each other, and did not resemble any real groupings in the sense of the competition.

Teams
There were two routes which the teams were separated into during qualifying:
Champions Route, which included all domestic champions which did not automatically qualify for the group stage.
League Route (also called the Non-champions Path or the Best-placed Path), which included all domestic non-champions which did not automatically qualify for the group stage.

A total of 54 teams (39 in Champions Route, 15 in League Route) were involved in the qualifying phase and play-off round. The 10 winners of the play-off round (5 in Champions Route, 5 in League Route) advanced to the group stage to join the 22 automatic qualifiers. The 15 losers of the third qualifying round entered the Europa League play-off round, and the 10 losers of the play-off round entered the Europa League group stage.

Below were the participating teams (with their 2013 UEFA club coefficients), grouped by their starting rounds.

Champions Route

League Route

Notes

First qualifying round

Seeding
A total of four teams played in the first qualifying round. The draw was held on 24 June 2013.

Summary
The first legs were played on 2 July, and the second legs were played on 9 July 2013.

|}

Matches

Shirak won 3–1 on aggregate.

EB/Streymur won 7–3 on aggregate.

Second qualifying round

Seeding
A total of 34 teams played in the second qualifying round: 32 teams which entered in this round, and the two winners of the first qualifying round. The draw was held on 24 June 2013.

Notes

Summary
The first legs were played on 16 and 17 July, and the second legs were played on 23 and 24 July 2013.

|}

Notes

Matches

Skënderbeu won 1–0 on aggregate.

Steaua București won 5–1 on aggregate.

Viktoria Plzeň won 6–4 on aggregate.

Sheriff Tiraspol won 6–1 on aggregate.

Maribor won 2–0 on aggregate.

Molde won 3–0 on aggregate.

Elfsborg won 11–1 on aggregate.

Nõmme Kalju won 2–1 on aggregate.

FH won 3–1 on aggregate.

Legia Warsaw won 4–1 on aggregate.

Celtic won 5–0 on aggregate.

Dinamo Zagreb won 6–0 on aggregate.

Maccabi Tel Aviv won 4–1 on aggregate.

Shakhter Karagandy won 2–0 on aggregate.

1–1 on aggregate; Partizan won on away goals.

Ludogorets Razgrad won 4–2 on aggregate.

Dinamo Tbilisi won 9–2 on aggregate.

Third qualifying round

Seeding
A total of 30 teams played in the third qualifying round:
Champions Route: three teams which entered in this round, and the 17 winners of the second qualifying round.
League Route: ten teams which entered in this round.
The draw was held on 19 July 2013.

Notes

Summary
The first legs were played on 30 and 31 July, and the second legs were played on 6 and 7 August 2013.

|+Champions Route

|}

|+League Route

|}

Matches

Basel won 4–3 on aggregate.

1–1 on aggregate; Legia Warsaw won on away goals.

Ludogorets Razgrad won 3–1 on aggregate.

Steaua București won 3–1 on aggregate.

1–1 on aggregate; Maribor won on away goals.

Celtic won 1–0 on aggregate.

Shakhter Karagandy won 5–3 on aggregate.

Austria Wien won 1–0 on aggregate.

Viktoria Plzeň won 10–2 on aggregate.

Dinamo Zagreb won 4–0 on aggregate.

Zenit Saint Petersburg won 6–0 on aggregate.

Fenerbahçe won 4–2 on aggregate.

Metalist Kharkiv won 3–1 on aggregate.

PSV Eindhoven won 5–0 on aggregate.

Lyon won 2–0 on aggregate.

Play-off round

Seeding
A total of 20 teams played in the play-off round:
Champions Route: the ten Champions Route winners of the third qualifying round.
League Route: five teams which entered in this round, and the five League Route winners of the third qualifying round.
The draw was held on 9 August 2013.

Notes

Summary
The first legs were played on 20 and 21 August, and the second legs were played on 27 and 28 August 2013.

|+Champions Route

|}

|+League Route

|}

Matches

Austria Wien won 4–3 on aggregate.

Basel won 6–2 on aggregate.

Viktoria Plzeň won 4–1 on aggregate.

Celtic won 3–2 on aggregate.

3–3 on aggregate; Steaua București won on away goals.

Real Sociedad won 4–0 on aggregate.

Schalke 04 won 4–3 on aggregate.

Zenit Saint Petersburg won 8–3 on aggregate.

Milan won 4–1 on aggregate.

Arsenal won 5–0 on aggregate.

Statistics
There were 235 goals in 88 matches in the qualifying phase and play-off round, for an average of 2.67 goals per match.

Top goalscorers

Top assists

Notes

References

External links
2013–14 UEFA Champions League

Qualifying Rounds
2013-14